Pergulinae is a subfamily of pergid sawflies in the family Pergidae. There are at least 2 genera and about 19 described species in Pergulinae.
They are mostly found in South America and Western 
Australia

Genera
These two genera belong to the subfamily Pergulinae:
 Haplostegus Konow, 1901
 Pergula Morice, 1918

References

Tenthredinoidea